The Cadillac CT6 (short for Cadillac Touring 6) is a full-size luxury car manufactured by Cadillac. The CT6 was introduced at the 2015 New York International Auto Show and went on sale in the U.S. in March 2016. It is the first car to adopt the brand's revised naming strategy, as well as the first rear-wheel drive full-size Cadillac sedan since the Fleetwood was discontinued in 1996. It is built on a different platform than the smaller CTS and is engineered as a rear-wheel drive vehicle with optional all-wheel drive. In addition to its primary markets of North America and China, the CT6 was also offered in Europe, Korea, Japan, and the Middle East.

General Motors discontinued the assembly of the Cadillac CT6 in the US in February 2020 due to poor sales and retooling of the Detroit/Hamtramck facility for electric vehicle production, beginning with the new GMC Hummer EV.

Overview

The CT6 is longer and wider than the XTS and offers more interior volume. It uses a mix of steel and aluminum making it lighter than other cars in its size class. It was brought to market as an addition to, not a replacement for, the now-discontinued XTS. 

Cadillac projected the CT6 would be the temporary flagship until it would bring a larger, more luxurious CT8 sedan to market. However, the CT8 did not come to fruition, and the CT6 remained the brand's flagship sedan. 

For the American market, the CT6 was manufactured at GM's Detroit/Hamtramck Assembly plant. On March 11, 2016, the first CT6 delivery took place, having been delivered to the winner of a 2015 auction for the first CT6 sold. The vehicle sold for $200,000 at the auction. The car was "Platinum" trim level and painted Stellar Black Metallic.

Installed within the CT6 is the second generation CUE system, 4G LTE connectivity, and an 8 speaker Bose audio system, a Bose Centerpoint 10 speaker system included with the "Luxury" and "Premium Luxury" package, with a 34-speaker Bose Panaray audio system included with the top level "Platinum" package. Cadillac once again offers the Enhanced Night Vision which was discontinued as of 2004 on the DeVille. Available equipment includes Adaptive Cruise Control, as well as Magnetic Ride Control coupled with accident avoidance technologies. New with the CT6 is the Rear Camera Mirror, which uses streaming video from a camera that displays within the rear view mirror, which provides an enhanced view without obstructions from the "C-pillar" and passengers sitting in the rear area. The front seats can be adjusted 14 different ways, with an optional 16- or 20-way adjustment package that includes heated and cooled seat with a massage feature for both front and rear passengers. Rear seat passengers are also offered, retractable 10" LCD screens that extract up from the back of the front seat seatbacks, behind the front seat headrests that can play Blu-ray content for brought-in devices, that were introduced on the Cadillac Escala concept car.According to Cadillac Society’s website. Cadillac is planning to bring the CT6 for the 2024 model year.

Cadillac has said that a new flagship, to be marketed as the Celestiq, is in development and will be a battery-powered liftback sedan.

Powertrain
The CT6 was initially available with a choice of three engines, a 4-cylinder 2.0-liter turbo (a first for a full-size Cadillac) and two V6 engines, a 3.6-liter and a 3.0-liter twin-turbocharged offering  and  together with cylinder deactivation. The CT6 will be available in both rear-wheel drive (standard on four-cylinder models) and all-wheel drive (standard on all six-cylinder models). Torque for both engines is  respectively. This is the most sophisticated V8 engine ever made by General Motors. It reportedly cost GM about $20,000 each to produce this engine. Production of the CT6-V was limited, and only 875 cars were made for 2019 and 2020 while the Platinum model production numbers were only 625 for 2019 and 2020. Badging for the 2019 and 2020 CT6-V is the stylized Cadillac "V" on the trunk while the Platinum badging is 4.2tt for 2019 models and 800t for 2020 models.

CT6 PHEV
A plug-in hybrid variant, the CT6 PHEV, debuted at the 2015 Shanghai Auto Show. The plug-in hybrid uses a similar powertrain as the current Chevrolet Volt (second generation). The powertrain is manufactured in the United States and the vehicle's final assembled point is in Jinqiao, China (by Shanghai GM). The CT6 plug-in hybrid was released in the Chinese market in December 2016. The CT6 PHEV went on sale in the U.S. in March 2017 in Premium Luxury trim level with a base price of US$75,095, also before applicable government incentives.

The CT6 PHEV has an EPA fuel economy rating of 62 MPGe (54 kWh per 100 miles) combined while running on full electric power, or 25 MPG combined in hybrid mode. The CT6 PHEV is the first Cadillac product for the U.S. market to have its final assembly point in China.

Technology
The CT6 uses the Bose Panaray Surround-Sound System, using Dolby DTS Surround Sound Technology. The system consists of 34 speakers, including ones mounted in the front seat headrests, as well as a motorized center-channel speaker that retracts from the center of the instrument panel. The system uses Bose's automotive sound system technologies, as well as technologies from its Panaray line of professional speakers. The CT6 line comes standard with one of three Bose premium audio systems: an 8-speaker Bose Premium Sound System, a 10-speaker Bose Centerpoint Surround-Sound System, or the top-of-the-line 34-speaker Bose Panaray Surround-Sound System.

The CT6 uses a rear view mirror camera, which allows the driver to easily see what is behind them via a digital image projected onto the rearview mirror. This is the first vehicle to offer a rearview camera mounted in the rearview mirror.

Starting in 2017, Cadillac Super Cruise became available for semi-autonomous highway driving. It is part of a $5,000 option package on CT6's Premium Luxury model and is standard on the top-of-the-line Platinum.

CT6-V

Introduced as a high-performance version of the CT6, the CT6-V (formerly known as the V-Sport) was first revealed at the 2018 New York Auto Show. This engine has an  bore and  stroke with a compression ratio of 9.8:1. In order to withstand the stress of a high-performance engine and reduce internal friction, Cadillac has used forged steel connecting rods and a special coating for piston pins. To improve efficiency, Cadillac employed cylinder deactivation on cylinders 2, 3, 5, and 8 while variable timing was used on all four camshafts (which can adjust 55 degrees on the exhaust and 70 degrees on the intake). When the engine is off, the intake cams are parked in the middle of their travel, preventing exhaust/intake valve overlap to allow for easier starting and smoother initial idle. Cast stainless steel exhaust manifolds incorporate the housing within the engine bank for the twin-scroll Mitsubishi Heavy Industries turbochargers to allow for better response. The intercooler is mounted just above each cylinder head, which reduces the charge air temperature by approximately  before reaching the engine intake.

The engines were hand-assembled and personally signed at the Bowling Green plant in Kentucky where each Chevrolet Corvette is also assembled. The engines are mated to a 10-speed automatic transmission, which uses Performance Algorithm Shift programming to achieve the ideal shifting patterns. The CT6-V also features an AWD system with optimized Transfer case, rear steering, and mechanical Limited Slip Differential (LSD). The AWD system will adjust according to the 3 different driving modes available. The standard torque bias remains 40:60 front to rear, but will adjust to a torque split of 10:90 for optimized track performance with minimum understeer. Furthermore, the front end and rear end are redesigned; the front features a new hood, headlamps, and grille while the rear features a new deck lid and tail lamps. The chassis is recalibrated with specific stabilizer bars, springs, and Magnetic Ride dampers.

Reception
The car was chosen as one of the Top 10 Tech Cars by the IEEE in 2018.

Sales

See also
 Electric car use by country
 List of modern production plug-in electric vehicles
 Plug-in electric vehicle

References

External links

Official website (China)

CT6
Flagship vehicles
Cars introduced in 2016
Plug-in hybrid vehicles
Sedans
Full-size vehicles
Limousines
Rear-wheel-drive vehicles
All-wheel-drive vehicles